Lynn Catherine Carey (born October 29, 1946) is an American singer, songwriter, model, and actress best known as the lead vocalist in the band Mama Lion. She is also the daughter of actor Macdonald Carey.

Biography
Born in Los Angeles, California, Carey first began her career as a teen model and actress appearing in the 1966 cult film Lord Love a Duck as well as several guest slots on the T.V. shows Lassie, The Man from U.N.C.L.E., Run for Your Life, The Donna Reed Show and The Wild Wild West.

In the late 1960s, she joined and recorded with the band C.K. Strong for their 1969 self-titled release. The band later opened for Procol Harum in concert.

She subsequently recorded with Neil Merryweather on the 1970 joint project album Ivar Avenue Reunion which also featured musicians Barry Goldberg and Charlie Musselwhite. Also in 1970, she provided the vocals for the singing of fictional character Kelly McNamara ("Dolly Read") in Russ Meyer's Beyond the Valley of the Dolls. In addition to singing, Carey also co-wrote two songs for the soundtrack with composer Stu Phillips.

For legal reasons, however, Lynn Carey's vocals are not on the 1970 soundtrack LP, but Ami Rushes', which disappointed fans with the original film versions.

The labels did not become available until 2003/2004, Harkit Records and Soundtrack Classics, the vocal recordings with Lynn Carey and Barbara "Sandi" Robison, released on CD and LP as bonus tracks.

The song "Once I Had Love" is missing on the CD, but is included on the LP.

"Once I Had Love" was released on a CD by another label, but for this they again used LP recording with Ami Rushes (see Discography).

In 1971, the album Vacuum Cleaner resulted, co-credited to 'Merryweather & Carey'.

In December 1972, Carey was Penthouse magazine's Pet of the Month. Earlier that same year, she and Merryweather formed the group 'Mama Lion' and released the albums Preserve Wildlife and its 1973 follow-up Give It Everything I've Got. Lynn and the band are seen performing in another Russ Meyer film, The Seven Minutes. Extensive tours of Europe and North America followed, including appearances at The Montreux Jazz Festival and performances on German television.

In 1984, her debut solo release Good Times! (which she produced along with co-producer Ollie Mitchell) showcased her jazz and big band leanings. A remastered CD reissue of the album was released in 2000. During the early 1980s, Carey also performed with the L.A. Jazz Choir and appeared on the group's second Grammy-nominated album, From All Sides, released in 1985.

During the 1990s and in the early 2000s, she performed in Russia on several occasions. In 2001, the archival CD release Lynn Carey - Mama Lion... Roars Back! was issued featuring the early Mama Lion "demos" which secured the group their initial record deal as well as unreleased 1980-1990s solo material.

Her studio session credits range from backing vocals for Charlie Musselwhite (1975) to Eric Burdon (1980s era), Michel Berger and providing music for various television and film scores in the 1980s.

Carey credits her father with introducing her to the world of jazz music and foreign film.

Discography 

C.K. Strong
 C.K. Strong (Epic BN-26473, 1969) with Jefferson Kewley

Ivar Avenue Reunion
 Ivar Avenue Reunion (RCA LSP-4442, 1970)

Merryweather & Carey
 Vacuum Cleaner (RCA LSP-4485, 1971) with Neil Merryweather

Mama Lion
 Preserve Wildlife (Family Productions FPS-2702, 1972)
 Give It Everything I've Got (Family Productions FPS-2713, 1973)

Lynn Carey / Mama Lion
 Good Times! (Big Blonde BB-1001, 1984)
 Mama Lion... Roars Back! (Music Unlimited SRM-292, 2001)

Soundtrack 

 Stu Phillips – Beyond The Valley Of The Dolls - The Original Soundtrack - 2004 - with the original film songs, Lynn Carey and Barbara "Sandi" Robison sing as bonus tracks. (CD + LP)                                                                        Released by Soundtrack Classics - SCL 1408 and Harkit Records - HRKCD 8032.
 Various – Beyond The Valley Of The Dolls / Groupie Girl (Original Motion Picture Soundtracks - Label: Screen Gold Records - SGLDCD00010) - with the song "Once I Had Love"-1997 (CD), sung by Lynn Carey and Barbara "Sandi" Robison - for this CD one had sampled from the vinyl LP from 1970. Then there are not all original versions on the CD, but the new recordings with Ami Rushes and we only hear Barbara on two songs. For legal reasons, Lynn Carey was not allowed to sing for the LP recordings. But since 2004 there are also vinyl editions with the original film recordings. Lynn Carey and Barbara Robison can be heard in the film, not Ami Rushes.

The six original versions, sung by Lynn Carey and Barbara "Sandi" Robison:
"Find It", "In The Long Run", "Sweet Talkin' Candyman", "Come with the Gentle People",
"Look On Up At the Bottom", "Once I Had Love"

Lynn Carey also sings the song "Midnight Tricks" in the Russ Meyer film The Seven Minutes (1971) with Neil Merryweather.

References

External links
 

1946 births
Living people
American film actresses
American women singer-songwriters
Female models from California
Singer-songwriters from California
Penthouse Pets
Actresses from Los Angeles
Place of birth missing (living people)
21st-century American women